John Louis Noppenberg (September 8, 1917 – September 22, 2006) was an American football back who played two seasons for the Pittsburgh Steelers and the Detroit Lions. He was drafted in the 13th round of the 113th pick of the 1940 NFL Draft by the Pittsburgh Steelers. He played college football at the University of Miami for the Miami Hurricanes football team.

References

1917 births
2006 deaths
Miami Hurricanes football players
Pittsburgh Steelers players
Detroit Lions players